Wayne Arthurs (born 18 March 1971) is a retired Australian professional tennis player.

Career
His serve was his strongest weapon by far, and had been referred to as the "best in the world" by several of his fellow players, including Jim Courier, Andre Agassi, Thomas Johansson, and Ivo Karlović. He consistently had one of the highest ace counts on the ATP Tour and favours a serve-and-volley style of play. 

Arthurs has won 12 ATP doubles titles in his career. In February 2005 he achieved a belated breakthrough in singles by winning the ATP event in Scottsdale, United States, the Tennis Channel Open, in straight sets over Croat Mario Ančić. No other player in history had won his first ATP singles title at such an advanced age (Arthurs was almost 34 at the time). He also was a runner-up there for doubles with Paul Hanley, and lost to American team Bob and Mike Bryan. He is an Australian hero when it comes to Davis Cup, winning countless doubles rubbers for Australia. Throughout his singles career Arthurs experienced victory over no fewer than six players who have reached the number 1 world ranking: Pete Sampras, Marat Safin, Yevgeny Kafelnikov, Patrick Rafter, Andy Roddick and Gustavo Kuerten. He also beat Stefan Edberg (another former number 1) in a money tournament in England on Grass -  at the time, Arthurs' singles ranking was 1100 and Edberg's was 2, making for one of the biggest differences in ranking between winner and loser on the Tour that year.

In his last ever Australian Open match the Aussie retired just three games into his third-round match against American Mardy Fish due to a rare reaction to a local anaesthetic. In practice that morning he tried out a short-term local anaesthetic that worked well against his sore hip. Just before the match began, he took another shot that was supposed to last for the duration of the match. The stronger dose deadened his leg and he could not co-ordinate his movements. He refused to blame his doctors who said that this adverse reaction happens to about 1 in 1000 patients. Arthurs became emotional during the match once he realised he couldn't compete. After the in-between-game break, down 3–0 he waved to the crowd who thanked him for an outstanding career. It was the last Australian Open match of his career. At the time, he was the oldest participant in the Australian Open.

Arthurs played his final tournament at Wimbledon in 2007. He won qualifying matches to advance to the main draw of the major tournament. In the first round he came back from two sets down to finally win in five sets against Dutch teenager Thiemo de Bakker. In the second round Arthurs caused a major boilover by defeating the 11th-seeded Spaniard Tommy Robredo in straight sets. Arthurs was defeated in the third round by 19th seed Jonas Björkman in straight sets.

Following his retirement, Arthurs coached Queensland player Oliver Anderson.

In January 2019 Arthurs received the OLY post-nominal title at the Brisbane International tournament.

On 30 August 2000, Arthurs was awarded the Australian Sports Medal for his strong commitment to tennis.

ATP career finals

Singles: 2 (1 title, 1 runner-up)

Doubles: 27 (12 titles, 15 runner-ups)

ATP Challenger and ITF Futures finals

Singles: 3 (3–0)

Doubles: 15 (3–12)

Performance timelines

Singles

Doubles

Mixed doubles

References

External links 
 
 
 
 
 
 
 Arthurs Recent Match Results
 Arthurs World Ranking History

1971 births
Living people
Australian male tennis players
Hopman Cup competitors
Olympic tennis players of Australia
Tennis players from Adelaide
Tennis players from Melbourne
Tennis players at the 2004 Summer Olympics
Recipients of the Australian Sports Medal